Ralph Harrison (1885 – December 1966) was a British racewalker. He competed in the men's 3500 metres walk at the 1908 Summer Olympics.

References

1885 births
1966 deaths
Athletes (track and field) at the 1908 Summer Olympics
British male racewalkers
Olympic athletes of Great Britain
Place of birth missing